Ali Khaseif Humad Khaseif Housani, known as Ali Khasif (born 9 June 1987 in Abu Dhabi) is an Emirati footballer who plays for Al-Jazira as a goalkeeper.

Reference

External link

Ali Khasif at UAE Pro League

Emirati footballers
United Arab Emirates international footballers
Association football goalkeepers
2011 AFC Asian Cup players
Footballers at the 2012 Summer Olympics
Olympic footballers of the United Arab Emirates
1987 births
Living people
Al Jazira Club players
UAE Pro League players
Fujairah FC players
UAE First Division League players
Asian Games medalists in football
Footballers at the 2006 Asian Games
Footballers at the 2010 Asian Games
2019 AFC Asian Cup players
Asian Games silver medalists for the United Arab Emirates
Medalists at the 2010 Asian Games